The Salesian Pastoral Youth Service (SPYS) is a Maltese Salesian team of religious and lay youth leaders that aims to develop and implement a programme of holistic formation for young people. The project started in 1995 by developing programmes with a target group in the local area of Sliema, Malta, and now operates nationally.

The group now also has involvement on a wider European scale as well as in developing countries through its international office, SPYS.int.

SPYS has been since 2004 also a member of the Don Bosco Youth-Net - a network of European Salesian organizations that provides training and support to young people.

References

External links
 Official Website

Youth organisations based in Malta
Catholic youth organizations
Youth organizations established in 1995